Sørøysundet is a strait in Hasvik Municipality and Hammerfest Municipality in Troms og Finnmark county, Norway. The strait separates the large island of Sørøya from the islands of Stjernøya, Seiland, and Kvaløya. To the southwest the strait opens up into Lopphavet sea. There are no bridges or tunnels that cross the strait, but there are ferry routes crossing it.

References

Straits of Norway
Landforms of Troms og Finnmark
Hammerfest
Hasvik